Frank & Ava is a 2018 American biographical drama film directed by Michael Oblowitz and starring Rico Simonini as Frank Sinatra and Emily Elicia Low as Ava Gardner.  It is based on the play of the same name by Willard Manus. This marked the final film appearances of Harry Dean Stanton and Katherine Helmond before their passing in 2017 and 2019 respectively.

Cast
Rico Simonini as Frank Sinatra
Emily Elicia Low as Ava Gardner
Eric Roberts as Harry Cohn
Jonathan Silverman as Mannie Sacks
Harry Dean Stanton as Sheriff Lloyd
Lukas Haas as Officer Josenhans
Joanne Baron as Hedda Hopper
Richard Portnow as Walter Winchell
Joanna Sanchez as Louella Parsons 
Katherine Helmond as Betty Burns

Reception
Stephen Farber of The Hollywood Reporter gave the film a negative review and wrote "Bargain-basement treatment of Hollywood royalty."

References

External links
 
 
 

2018 drama films
American biographical films
American drama films
American films based on plays
Married couples
Films directed by Michael Oblowitz
2010s English-language films
2010s American films